Tim Vesely (born 10 December 1963) is a Canadian musician and songwriter.  He is best known as a founding member of the indie rock band Rheostatics, in which he shared vocal duties with bandmates Dave Bidini and Martin Tielli.  Vesely wrote much of the band's conventionally pop and rock-oriented material, including both of the band's most successful singles, "Claire" and "Bad Time to Be Poor".

Vesely announced his departure from the Rheostatics on 8 September 2006.  He played his final show with the band on 30 March 2007 at Massey Hall.

He has also released two albums with his own band, The Violet Archers, and plays bass with Great Aunt Ida. Vesely was also a member of L’Étranger, appearing on that band's final album, Sticks and Stones, in 1986.

See also

Music of Canada
Canadian rock
List of Canadian musicians

References

External links

1963 births
Living people
Canadian indie pop musicians
Canadian indie rock musicians
Canadian male singers
Canadian rock bass guitarists
Canadian rock singers
Canadian songwriters
Male bass guitarists
Musicians from Toronto
People from Etobicoke
Rheostatics members
Writers from Toronto